An Eternal Combat is a 1991 Hong Kong fantasy horror film directed by Thomas Yip and written by Ho Tung. The film stars Joey Wong, Lam Ching Ying, Shing Fui-On, Anthony Wong, Joh Chung-Sing and Gabriel Wong Yat Shan. The film was released in Hong Kong on 5 January 1991.

Plot
In the period of Hongzhi Emperor (1487-1505) in the Ming dynasty (1368-1644), the Japanese Ghost King does all kinds of evil in the Chinese territory. When he meets Shi Shi, a beautiful young woman, he falls in love with her and forces Shi Shi to marry him. Caolu Jushi, a Maoshan Taoist priest, is always ready to defend the weak and helpless. Caolu Jushi and his disciple fight with the Japanese Ghost King but fail. At that time, Ma Shangfeng, an official in the imperial court, helps to capture the Japanese Ghost King. A war triggers the gate of the universe, they cross the time and space and comes to Hong Kong in the 20th Century.

Cast
 Joey Wong as Shi Shi, a beautiful Ming dynasty woman.
 Lam Ching Ying as Caolu Jushi, a Maoshan Taoist priest.
 Shing Fui-On as Ma Shangfeng, an official in the Ming Empire.
 Anthony Wong as Ben
 Joh Chung-Sing as the Japanese Ghost King
 Gabriel Wong Yat Shan
 Lau Siu Ming as the mental patient.
 Hui Shiu-hung as the Father.

Music

Release
The film premiered in Hong Kong on 5 January 1991.

Box office
The film grossed HK $6,469,570.00.

References

External links

1991 films
Hong Kong fantasy films
Hong Kong horror films
Films set in Hong Kong
Films set in the Ming dynasty
Hong Kong supernatural horror films
Dark fantasy films
Supernatural fantasy films
1990s supernatural horror films
1990s Hong Kong films